Filatima textorella is a moth of the family Gelechiidae. It is found in southern France and Spain.

The wingspan is 15–19 mm.

The larvae feed on Dorycnium pentaphyllum.

References

Moths described in 1908
Filatima